Kadoli  is a village in the southern state of Karnataka, India. It is located in the Belgaum taluk of Belgaum district in Karnataka.

Demographics 
At the 2001 India census, Kadoli had a population of 9849 with 5008 males and 4841 females.

See also 
 Belgaum
 Districts of Karnataka

References

External links 
 

Villages in Belagavi district